Leptobrachium hendricksoni (common names: Thai spadefoot toad, bright yellow-eyed crawl frog, spotted litter frog) is a species of amphibian in the family Megophryidae. It is found in Malay Peninsula (Southern Thailand and Peninsular Malaysia), Sarawak (Borneo), and Sumatra (Indonesia). Its natural habitats are tropical moist lowland forests, rivers, freshwater marshes, and nearby plantations and heavily degraded former forests. It is threatened by habitat loss.

References

External links
Amphibian and Reptiles of Peninsular Malaysia - Leptobrachium hendricksoni

hendricksoni
Amphibians of Indonesia
Amphibians of Malaysia
Amphibians of Thailand
Taxonomy articles created by Polbot
Amphibians described in 1962